Hay Al-Arab Sports Club is a Sudanese football club based in Port Sudan. They play in the top division in Sudanese football, the Sudan Premier League. Their rivals are Hilal Alsahil, a team which is also based in Port Sudan.

They play their home matches at the Stade Port Sudan.

Honours

National titles
Sudan Premier League
 Runners-up (2) :1981, 1999

Performance in CAF competitions
CAF Confederation Cup (1) appearances
2009 - Preliminary round
African Cup Winners' Cup (1) appearances

1982 –First round 

CAF Cup: 2 appearances
1996 – Second Round
2000 – Second Round

Performance in CECAFA competitions
CECAFA Clubs Cup 1 appearance

2009 – Champions

Crest

References

External links
 Team profile – The Biggest Football Archive of the World

Football clubs in Sudan
1928 establishments in Sudan
Association football clubs established in 1928